Cops L.A.C. (Cops: Local Area Command) is a 2010 Australian television police drama, which screened on the Nine Network. The series followed the work of officers at the Seaview Local Area Command, a fictitious police response area of the 'State Police' set in harbourside Sydney, New South Wales. The first series premiered on 2 September 2010, in the same timeslot of Network Ten's police drama Rush.

On 22 November 2010, the Nine Network discontinued the show due to the high production costs.

Cast

Main cast

Recurring cast

Plot
Cops L.A.C. revolves around the police operations of Seaview Local Area Command. Superintendent Jack Finch, a seasoned officer, is the Local Area Commander, with Crime Manager Detective Inspector Diane Pappas at his side. The uniformed officers stationed at Seaview handle anything from general police response calls to investigation of assaults and muggings, with detectives dealing with cases involving drug dealers and car crashes, shootings, stabbings, and armed robbery.

Production
The first series consisted of 13 episodes and was initiated by Jo Horsburgh and commissioned by the Nine Network in 2009, it was produced by Diane Haddon, Lisa Scott and in-house by the Nine Network Drama Department. Production started on 27 May 2010 and ended on 11 November 2010, after various scheduling changes. Tim Pye, a writer on the series described the show as "like The Bill, but with a higher body count." When researching the real-life Local Area Command, he discovered "the more you research the business of policing, the more wondrous it is that people do it… But they stick with it and love it." Filming wrapped up for the first series in mid-September 2010.

Episodes

Ratings

Home media 
The season was released on DVD as a three-disc set, under the title of Cops: Local Area Command – The Complete Series on 6 January 2011.

References

External links
 Cops L.A.C. on Metacritic

2010 Australian television series debuts
2010 Australian television series endings
Nine Network original programming
2010s Australian drama television series
2010s Australian crime television series
2010s police procedural television series
Television shows set in New South Wales
English-language television shows